strace is a diagnostic, debugging and instructional userspace utility for Linux.  It is used to monitor and tamper with interactions between processes and the Linux kernel, which include system calls, signal deliveries, and changes of process state.  The operation of strace is made possible by the kernel feature known as ptrace.

Some Unix-like systems provide other diagnostic tools similar to strace, such as truss.

History 
Strace was originally written for SunOS by Paul Kranenburg in 1991, according to its copyright notice, and published early in 1992, in the volume three of comp.sources.sun.  The initial README file contained the following:

 is a system call tracer for Sun(tm) systems much like the Sun supplied program .  is a useful utility to sort of debug programs for which no source is available which unfortunately includes almost all of the Sun supplied system software.

Later, Branko Lankester ported this version to Linux, releasing his version in November 1992 with the second release following in 1993.  Richard Sladkey combined these separate versions of strace in 1993, and ported the program to SVR4 and Solaris in 1994, resulting in strace 3.0 that was announced in comp.sources.misc in mid-1994.

Beginning in 1996, strace was maintained by Wichert Akkerman. During his tenure, strace development migrated to CVS; ports to FreeBSD and many architectures on Linux (including ARM, IA-64, MIPS, PA-RISC, PowerPC, s390, SPARC) were introduced. In 2002, the burden of strace maintainership was transferred to Roland McGrath. Since then, strace gained support for several new Linux architectures (AMD64, s390x, SuperH), bi-architecture support for some of them, and received numerous additions and improvements in syscalls decoders on Linux; strace development migrated to git during that period. Since 2009, strace is actively maintained by Dmitry Levin. strace gained support for AArch64, ARC, AVR32, Blackfin, Meta, Nios II, OpenSISC 1000, RISC-V, Tile/TileGx, Xtensa architectures since that time.

The last version of strace that had some (evidently dead) code for non-Linux operating systems was 4.6, released in March 2011.  In strace version 4.7, released in May 2012, all non-Linux code had been removed; since strace 4.13, the project follows Linux kernel's release schedule, and with the version 5.0, it follows Linux's versioning scheme as well.

In 2012 strace also gained support for path tracing and file descriptor path decoding. In August 2014, strace 4.9 was released, where support for stack traces printing was added. In December 2016, syscall fault injection feature was implemented.

Version history

Usage and features 
The most common use is to start a program using strace, which prints a list of system calls made by the program. This is useful if the program continually crashes, or does not behave as expected; for example using strace may reveal that the program is attempting to access a file which does not exist or cannot be read.

An alternative application is to use the  flag to attach to a running process. This is useful if a process has stopped responding, and might reveal, for example, that the process is blocking whilst attempting to make a network connection.

Among other features, strace allows the following:
 Specifying a list of paths to be traced (-P /etc/ld.so.cache, for example).
 Specifying a list of file descriptors whose I/O should be dumped (-e read= and -e write= options).
 Counting syscall execution time and count (-T, -c, -C, and -w options;  -U option enables printing of additional information, like minimum and maximum syscall execution time).
 Printing relative or absolute time stamps (-t and -r options).
 Tampering with the syscalls being executed (-e inject=syscall specification:tampering specification option): modifying return (:retval=;  since strace 4.16) and error code (:error=;  since strace 4.15) of the specified syscalls, inject signals (:signal=;  since strace 4.16), delays (:delay_enter= and :delay_exit=;  since strace 4.22), and modify data pointed by syscall arguments (:poke_enter= and :poke_exit=;  since strace 5.11) upon their execution.
 Extracting information about file descriptors (including sockets, -y option;  -yy option provides some additional information, like endpoint addresses for sockets, paths and device major/minor numbers for files).
 Printing stack traces, including (since strace 4.21) symbol demangling (-k option).
 Filtering by syscall return status (-e status= option; since strace 5.2).
 Perform translation of thread, process, process group, and session IDs appearing in the trace into strace's PID namespace (--pidns-translation option;  since strace 5.9).
 Decoding SELinux context information associated with processes, files, and descriptors (--secontext option;  since strace 5.12).

strace supports decoding of arguments of some classes of ioctl commands, such as BTRFS_*, V4L2_*, DM_*, NSFS_*, MEM*, EVIO*, KVM_*, and several others;  it also supports decoding of various netlink protocols.

As strace only details system calls, it cannot be used to detect as many problems as a code debugger such as GNU Debugger (gdb). It is, however, easier to use than a code debugger, and is a very useful tool for system administrators. It is also used by researchers to generate system call traces for later system call replay.

Examples 
The following is an example of typical output of the strace command:

user@server:~$ strace ls
...
open(".", O_RDONLY|O_NONBLOCK|O_LARGEFILE|O_DIRECTORY|O_CLOEXEC) = 3
fstat64(3, {st_mode=S_IFDIR|0755, st_size=4096, ...}) = 0
fcntl64(3, F_GETFD)                     = 0x1 (flags FD_CLOEXEC)
getdents64(3, /* 18 entries */, 4096)   = 496
getdents64(3, /* 0 entries */, 4096)    = 0
close(3)                                = 0
fstat64(1, {st_mode=S_IFIFO|0600, st_size=0, ...}) = 0
mmap2(NULL, 4096, PROT_READ|PROT_WRITE, MAP_PRIVATE|MAP_ANONYMOUS, -1, 0) = 0xb7f2c000
write(1, "autofs\nbackups\ncache\nflexlm\ngames"..., 86autofsA

The above fragment is only a small part of the output of strace when run on the 'ls' command. It shows that the current working directory is opened, inspected and its contents retrieved. The resulting list of file names is written to standard output.

Similar tools 
Different operating systems feature other similar or related instrumentation tools, offering similar or more advanced features; some of the tools (although using the same or a similar name) may use completely different work mechanisms, resulting in different feature sets or results.  Such tools include the following:

 Linux has ltrace that can trace library and system calls, xtrace that can trace X Window programs, SystemTap, perf, and trace-cmd and KernelShark that extend ftrace.
 AIX provides the  command
 HP-UX offers the  command
 Solaris / Illumos has truss and DTrace
 UnixWare provides the  command
 FreeBSD provides the  command, ktrace and DTrace
 NetBSD provides ktrace and DTrace
 OpenBSD uses ktrace and kdump
 macOS provides ktrace (10.4 and earlier), DTrace (from Solaris) and associated dtruss in 10.5 and later.
 Microsoft Windows has a similar utility called StraceNT, written by Pankaj Garg, and a similar GUI-based utility called Process Monitor, developed by Sysinternals.

See also

 gdb
 List of Unix commands
 lsof

Notes

References

External links
 strace project page
 Manual page
 OS Reviews article on strace
 "System Call Tracing with strace", a talk with an overview of strace features and usage, given by Michael Kerrisk at NDC TechTown 2018
 "Modern strace" (source), a talk with an overview of strace features, given by Dmitry Levin at DevConf.cz 2019

Unix programming tools
Command-line software
Free software programmed in C